Alan J Windsor (born 1945) is a former English international lawn and indoor bowler.

Bowls career

World Indoor Championships
He won the bronze medal in the 1980 World Indoor Bowls Championship. His first cap for England was in 1973 (outdoors) and 1974 (indoors).

Commonwealth Games
He represented England in the singles, at the 1982 Commonwealth Games in Brisbane, Queensland, Australia.

National
He was runner-up in the 1981 National Championships.

Personal life
By trade he was a school caretaker.

References

Living people
English male bowls players
1945 births
Bowls players at the 1982 Commonwealth Games
Commonwealth Games competitors for England